China International Aviation & Aerospace Exhibition, also known as the Airshow China or Zhuhai Airshow, is the largest airshow and aerospace trade expo in China. It has been held in even years in Zhuhai, Guangdong since 1996.

History

1996 

The first Airshow China was held from 5 to 10 November 1996. Performances included:
 Su-27 cobra
 Il-78 aerial refueling
 British "Golden Dream" aerobatic team
 "World Aerobatics Grand Prix"

1998 
The second Airshow China was held from 15 to 22 November 1998. Performances included:
 People's Liberation Army Air Force "August 1st"
 Russian Knights
 Canadian "Northern Lights" (later as Northern Lights Combat Air Support and now Lortie Aviation Inc.) using the Extra 300L
 British "Golden Dream" aerobatic team
 Russian Gromov Flight Research Institute cobra and aerial refueling

2000 
The third Airshow China was held from 6 to 12 November 2000. Performances included:
Kamov Ka-50
Sukhoi Su-30MK
 People's Liberation Army Air Force "August 1st"
 Russian Knights
 British "Golden Dream" aerobatic team
 FAI Star Aerobatic Team Elites

2002 
The fourth Airshow China was held from 3 to 7 November 2002.

2004 
The fifth Airshow China was held from 1 to 7 November 2004. Yang Liwei was present. Performances included:
 Strizhi
 People's Liberation Army Air Force "August 1st"

2006 
The sixth Airshow China was held from 31 October to 5 November 2006. The first three days were corporate days and not open to public. The remaining three days were public days. Over 30 countries and 600 aviation companies took part. Performances included:
 Russian Knights
 British "Golden Dream" aerobatic team

2008 
The seventh Airshow China was held from 4 to 9 November 2008. Some 4 billion U.S. dollars worth of deals were signed at the six-day event, including one involving Commercial Aircraft Corp. of China (COMAC) selling 25 ARJ21-700 regional jets to GE Commercial Aviation Services of the United States (first delivery by 2013). Additionally, the Chengdu J-10 and Xi'an JH-7A both made their first public appearances. Other performances included:
 Airbus A380
 H-6U tanker mock refueling two Shenyang J-8IIs
HAIG L-15
 Indian Air Force Surya Kiran

2010 
The eighth Airshow China was held in Zhuhai from 16 to 21 November 2010. It included:
 Airbus A380
 HAIG L-15 - Replaced with Ivchenko-Progress AL-222K-25F engine with afterburner
 People's Liberation Army Air Force "August 1st" – First open show after aircraft renewal with Chengdu J-10
 Pakistan Air Force Sherdils aerobatic team

2012 
The ninth Airshow China was held from 13 to 18 November 2012 and included:

 Shenyang J-31 display.
 FK-1000
 CM-602G
 TL500
 CM-506 kg

2014 
The tenth Airshow China was held from 11 to 16 November 2014.

2016 
The eleventh Airshow China was held from 1 to 6 November 2016 and included:

 Republic of Korea Air Force's Black Eagles aerobatic team
 Royal Air Force's Red Arrows
 fly passing of Chengdu J-20 LRIP model.

2018 
The twelfth Airshow China was held from 6 to 11 November 2018 and included presentation of:

 CM-401 missile system
 world's first quantum radar
 world's first air-cooling airplane-board radar
 aerobatic performance of Chengdu J-10B, one of world's first serial airplane with thrust vector control (TVC) engine
 fullscale mockup of Tianhe core module of future Chinese large modular space station
 aerobatic performance of Chengdu J-20 production model.

2021 
Originally scheduled to happen in 2020, it was postponed to the following year due to the Covid-19 pandemic. The thirteenth Airshow China was held from 28 September to 3 October 2021. A total of 700 companies have participated in the event online and offline, with more than 100 aircraft exhibited: 
FH-97 jet UAV 
Shenyang FC-31 
Tengyun spaceplane

2022 
The fourteenth Airshow China is scheduled to be held from 8 November to 13 November 2022.

Debut of E195-E2 E190-E2 also received certification from China's aviation regulator.
 CASIC Anti-UAV System, composed of DK-1 low-altitude search radar, the ZK-K20 air-defense control system, HQ-17AE and QW-12 short-range missiles, and ZR-1500 drone defense system.
Export and air-launched version of YJ-21 hypersonic missile.
JH-7A2 with AFK-98 stand-off cruise missile, AKF-88C anti-radiation missile and YL-5/YJ-1000-1 1,000-kilogram bomb. 
Chengdu J-20 stealth fighters ground display
Chinese 6th generation jet fighter aircraft concept
YY-20 tanker aircraft
KJ-500A AEW&C aircraft debut
FH-97A debut
Chengdu WZ-10 debut
Wing Loong III drone debut
Guizhou WZ-7 Soaring Dragon ground display
MD-22 near-space reusable aircraft
WS-19 engine mock-up

List of Past Performers (incomplete)
 August First (People's Liberation Army Air Force) 
 Russian Knights and Swifts
 Patrouille de France
 British "Golden Dream" aerobatics team and UK Utterly Butterfly aerobatics team
 Canadian Air Force
 IAA All Stars aerobatics team
 Indian Air Force Surya Kiran (2008)
 Indonesian Air Force
 Royal Thai Air Force

See also
 MAKS (air show)
 Air transport in China

References

External links

 China International Aviation & Aerospace Exhibition Homepage

Air shows in China
Zhuhai
Arms fairs
Autumn events in China